Ba-Pef was a minor underworld god in Egyptian mythology. The name literally means that Ba, meaning  that soul (ba). Ba-Pef is commonly portrayed as an obscure malevolent deity known from the Old Kingdom. During the Old and Middle Kingdom the priesthood of Ba-Pef was held by queens.

References

Further reading 
 Michael Jordan, Encyclopedia of Gods, Kyle Cathie Limited, 2002

Egyptian gods
Underworld gods
Evil gods